Herpetogramma couteneyi is a moth of the family Crambidae. It is endemic to Réunion.

See also
 List of moths of Réunion

References

Moths described in 2008
Lepidoptera of Réunion
Herpetogramma
Moths of Africa